Jiří Pešek (4 June 1927 in Prague – 20 May 2011) was a Czech football player and professional coach.

Pešek played for several clubs, including Bohemians Praha (1939–1951), Sparta Prague (1952–1955) and SK Slavia Praha (1956–1959).

He played for Czechoslovakia national team (11 matches and one goal), and was a participant at the 1954 FIFA World Cup, where he played in a match against Uruguay.

He coached Viktoria Žižkov, Baník Příbram, Sparta Chicago, Panserraikos, Finland, Valur, North Yemen and India.

Honours

Manager

India
SAFF Championship: 1993

References

External links
 

1927 births
2011 deaths
Czech footballers
Czechoslovak footballers
1954 FIFA World Cup players
Bohemians 1905 players
AC Sparta Prague players
SK Slavia Prague players
Footballers from Prague
Czechoslovakia international footballers
Czech football managers
Czechoslovak football managers
Expatriate football managers in Iceland
Association football forwards
India national football team managers
Valur (men's football) managers
Panserraikos F.C. managers
Czech expatriate football managers
1. FK Příbram managers
Yemen national football team managers